Selwyn is a current electorate in the New Zealand House of Representatives, composed of towns on the outskirts of Christchurch city.

Region and population centres
The electorate is mainly rural, stretching from the Southern Alps to the Banks Peninsula, its borders broadly defined by the Rakaia River in the south and the Waimakariri River in the north. Major towns include Rolleston, Lincoln, Prebbleton, and Darfield, with smaller towns such as Tai Tapu, Leeston and Dunsandel. The electorate also includes parts of Christchurch city's territorial authority.

History

Existence and changes to area 
An electorate called Selwyn existed between 1866 and 1919. A Selwyn electorate also existed between 1946 and 1972 and again from 1978 until it was absorbed by Rakaia for the first MMP election in 1996. The latest version of the Selwyn electorate was created for the 2008 election. This followed a review of electoral boundaries conducted after the 2006 Census, because of a general northwards population movement in the South Island. Even though the number of South Island electorates is fixed, the  decline in the population of electorates from Rakaia south has resulted in the boundaries of electorates from Invercargill north to Rakaia shifting further northwards.

Due to the rapid growth of Selwyn relative to Christchurch (which lost population after the earthquakes), the 2013 redistribution had Selwyn losing Halswell and Westmorland to Port Hills and Harewood to Waimakariri while regaining the towns of Rakaia and Chertsey back from Rangitata. Data from the 2018 census showed Selywn's population had continued to grow – it had the largest discrepancy of any electorate – and so the electorate would need to lose further area for the 2020 boundaries.

Voting history 
Edward Stevens was the electorate's first representative in 1866; he was returned elected unopposed.

The dominant topic for the 1875 election was the abolition of the Provinces. William Reeves, the incumbent, favoured the retention of the provincial system of government, while his opponent, Cecil Fitzroy, was an abolitionist. Fitzroy, who was 31 years old and 20 years Reeves' junior, narrowly won the election. Edward Lee acted as returning officer for the election.

The electorate is one of the National Party's safest seats. National have held the seat, whenever it has existed since it was first recreated in 1946. In 2011, the candidate for the other major New Zealand party, Labour, received less than 11% of the electoral vote and came third, behind the Greens in the 2011 election. In that election, the only polling booths where Adams didn't receive the most votes were Arthur's Pass and Diamond Harbour.

Members of Parliament
Key:

List MPs
Members of Parliament elected from party lists in elections where that person also unsuccessfully contested the Selwyn electorate. Unless otherwise stated, all MPs terms began and ended at general elections.

Election results

2020 election

2017 election

2014 election

2011 election

Electorate (as at 26 November 2011): 46,937

2008 election

1994 by-election
A by-election was held following the resignation of Ruth Richardson.

1993 election

1990 election

1987 election

1984 election

1981 election

1978 election

1966 election

1963 election

1960 election

1957 election

1954 election

1951 election

1949 election

1946 election

1899 election

1896 election

1890 election

1884 by-election

1883 by-election

1875 election

Notes

Notes

References

External links
Electorate Profile from Elections NZ

New Zealand electorates
Politics of Canterbury, New Zealand
1865 establishments in New Zealand
1946 establishments in New Zealand
1978 establishments in New Zealand
2008 establishments in New Zealand
1919 disestablishments in New Zealand
1972 disestablishments in New Zealand
1996 disestablishments in New Zealand